Imagining Numbers: (particularly the square root of minus fifteen) is a 2003 popular mathematics book by mathematician Barry Mazur 
The aim of the book is not a history of imaginary numbers by an attempt to
re-create, in ourselves, the shift of mathematical thought that makes it possible to imagine these numbers.

The book was published by Farrar, Straus and Giroux.

References

2003 non-fiction books
Mathematics books